The terms Anthropopithecus (Blainville, 1839) and Pithecanthropus (Haeckel, 1868) are obsolete taxa describing either chimpanzees or archaic humans. Both are derived from Greek  ἄνθρωπος (anthropos, "man") and πίθηκος (píthēkos, "ape" or "monkey"), translating to "man-ape" and "ape-man", respectively.

Anthropopithecus was originally coined to describe the chimpanzee and is now a junior synonym of Pan. It had been also used to describe several other extant and extinct species, among others the fossil Java Man. Very quickly, the latter was re-assigned to Pithecanthropus, originally coined to refer to a theoretical "missing link". Pithecanthropus is now classed as Homo erectus, thus a junior synonym of Homo.

History 
The genus Anthropopithecus was first proposed in 1841 by the French zoologist and anatomist Henri-Marie Ducrotay de Blainville (1777–1850) in order to give a genus name to some chimpanzee material that he was studying at the time.

After the genus Anthropopithecus was established by De Blainville in 1839, the British surgeon and naturalist John Bland-Sutton (1855–1936) proposed the species name Anthropopithecus troglodytes in 1883 to designate the common chimpanzee. However, the genus Pan had already been attributed to chimpanzees in 1816 by the German naturalist Lorenz Oken (1779–1851). Since any earlier nomenclature prevails over subsequent nomenclatures, the genus Anthropopithecus definitely lost its validity in 1895, becoming from that date a junior synonym of the genus Pan.

In 1879, the French archaeologist and anthropologist Gabriel de Mortillet (1821–1898) proposed the term Anthropopithecus to designate a "missing link", a hypothetical intermediate between ape and man that lived in the Tertiary and that supposedly, following De Mortillet's theory, produced eoliths. In his work of 1883 Le Préhistorique, antiquité de l'homme (The Prehistoric: Man's Antiquity, below quoted after the 2nd edition, 1885), De Mortillet writes:

When in 1905 the French paleontologist, paleoanthropologist and geologist Marcellin Boule (1861–1942) published a paper demonstrating that the eoliths were in fact geofacts produced by natural phenomena (freezing, pressure, fire), the argument proposed by De Mortillet fell into disrepute and his definition of the term Anthropopithecus was dropped. Yet the chimpanzee meaning of the genus persisted throughout the 19th century, even to the point of being a genus name attributed to fossil specimens. For example, a fossil primate discovered in 1878 by the British malacologist William Theobald (1829-1908) in the Pakistani Punjab in British India was first named Palaeopithecus in 1879 but later renamed Anthropopithecus sivalensis, assuming that these remains had to be brought back to the chimpanzee genus as the latter was being understood at the time. A famous example of a fossil Anthropopithecus is that of the Java Man, discovered in 1891 in Trinil, nearby the Solo River, in East Java, by Dutch physician and anatomist Eugène Dubois, who named the discovery with the scientific name Anthropopithecus erectus. This Dubois paper, written during the last quarter of 1892, was published by the Dutch government in 1893. In those early 1890s, the term Anthropopithecus was still being used by zoologists as the genus name of chimpanzees, so Dubois' Anthropopithecus erectus came to mean something like "the upright chimpanzee", or "the chimpanzee standing up". However, a year later, in 1893, Dubois considered that some anatomical characters proper to humans made necessary the attribution of these remains to a genus different than Anthropopithecus and he renamed the specimen of Java with the name Pithecanthropus erectus (1893 paper, published in 1894). Pithecanthropus is a genus that German biologist Ernst Haeckel (1834-1919) had created in 1868. Years later, in the 20th century, the German physician and paleoanthropologist Franz Weidenreich (1873-1948) compared in detail the characters of Dubois' Java Man, then named Pithecanthropus erectus, with the characters of the Peking Man, then named Sinanthropus pekinensis. Weidenreich concluded in 1940 that because of their anatomical similarity with modern humans it was necessary to gather all these specimens of Java and China in a single species of the genus Homo, the species Homo erectus. By that time, the genus Anthropopithecus had already been abandoned since 1895 at the earliest.

In popular culture 
The term Anthropopithecus is scientifically obsolete in the present day but did become widespread in popular culture, mainly in France and Belgium:
 In his short story Gil Braltar (1887), Jules Verne uses the term anthropopithèque (Anthropopithecus) to describe the simian aspect of one his characters, General McKackmale:

 In the science-fiction novel La Cité des Ténèbres (The City of Darkness), written by French journalist and writer Léon Groc in 1926, the anthropopithèques (Anthropopithecuses) are a large herd of ape-men having reached a very low degree of civilisation.
 The Belgian comics author Hergé made the term anthropopithèque (Anthropopithecus) one of the numerous swear words of Captain Haddock in the comic album series The Adventures of Tintin.
 In 2001, French singer Brigitte Fontaine wrote, sang and recorded the song titled Pipeau. In this song, the chorus repeats the term anthropopithèque (Anthropopithecus).

See also
 Anthropomorpha
 Archaic humans
 Caveman
 Hominini
 Human taxonomy
 Humanzee

Notes and references

Notes

References

Further reading
 John de Vos, lecture The Dubois collection: a new look at an old collection. In Winkler Prins, C.F. & Donovan, S.K. (eds.), VII International Symposium ‘Cultural Heritage in Geosciences, Mining and Metallurgy: Libraries - Archives - Museums’: “Museums and their collections”, Leiden (The Netherlands), 19–23 May 2003. Scripta Geologic, Special Issue, 4: 267-285, 9 figs.; Leiden, August 2004.

External links
 L'anthropopithèque (from the "Pôle international de la Préhistoire", archived document, in French)

Biological anthropology
Prehistoric life
Obsolete primate taxa